David Abell may refer to:

 Dave Abell, American member of the band Iced Earth
 David Abell (businessman) (born 1942), British businessman
 David Abell (composer) (died c. 1576), Danish-German composer and organist
 David Charles Abell (born 1958), British American orchestral conductor
 David H. Abell (c. 1807–1872), New York politician

See also
David Abel (disambiguation)